Avalalpam Vaikippoyi is a 1971 Indian Malayalam-language film, directed by John Sankaramangalam and produced by United Producers. The film stars Prem Nazir, Sheela, Jayabharathi and Adoor Bhasi. The film had musical score by G. Devarajan.

Cast

Prem Nazir
Sheela
Jayabharathi
Adoor Bhasi
Thikkurissy Sukumaran Nair
Jose Prakash
Prema
Shobha
Joy
Alummoodan
Amrith Vasudev
Bahadoor
Meena
S. P. Pillai
K. V. Shanthi
Sujatha

Soundtrack
The music was composed by G. Devarajan and the lyrics were written by Vayalar Ramavarma.

References

External links
 

1971 films
1970s Malayalam-language films
Films directed by John Sankaramangalam
Films based on Malayalam novels